Gołaś may refer to:
 Arkadiusz Gołaś (1981 – 2005), a Polish volleyball player
 Andrzej Maria Gołaś (born 1946), a Polish politician
 Michał Gołaś (born 1984), a Polish professional road bicycle racer

See also 

 Golas (disambiguation)
 Wiesław Gołas (born 1930), a Polish actor
 Gołas, a village in east-central Poland.
 Golaš, a mountain of Serbia.

Polish-language surnames